Paul Aiton (born 1985) is a Papua New Guinean former professional rugby league footballer  who is the current assistant coach of both the PNG Hunters in the Queensland Cup and the PNG Kumuls.

A Papua New Guinea international representative , Aiton played for the Penrith Panthers and the Cronulla-Sutherland Sharks in the NRL, and the Wakefield Trinity Wildcats, Leeds Rhinos and the Catalans Dragons in the Super League.

Early life 
Born in Mount Hagen, Papua New Guinea to a Papua New Guinean mother, Anne, and an Australian father, John, Aiton moved to Caboolture, Queensland, Australia with his family at a young age. He played his junior rugby league for the Caboolture Snakes and attended Morayfield State Primary School before joining the Wests Panthers in Brisbane, where he was signed by the Penrith Panthers in 2003.

Playing career

Penrith Panthers
After playing for Penrith's second-tier team, the St Mary's Cougars, in the NSWRL Premier League, Aiton was called upon to make his NRL début on 23 April 2006, starting at hooker for Penrith in their round 8 match against the Cronulla-Sutherland Sharks, as a result of an injury sustained by Craig Gower. Aiton made 13 further appearances from the bench in 2006, and was named Penrith's Ben Alexander Rookie of the Year. He played a total of 72 games, scoring 8 tries, for the Panthers between 2006 and 2009.

Cronulla-Sutherland Sharks
Aiton signed a 2-year deal with Cronulla in 2010 and went on to make 36 appearances, scoring 5 tries. At the end of the 2011 season it was announced he was to leave Cronulla to go play in the Super League.

Following his departure, he was one of seventeen Sharks players found guilty of using illegal substances under the club's 2011 supplements program. When the case was eventually concluded in 2016, Aiton had a twelve-month suspension recorded against his name, although he served none of the time due to backdating of the sanction.

Wakefield Trinity Wildcats
Aiton transferred to Wakefield Trinity Wildcats in England on a two-year contract from 2012. He made 47 appearances for them in 2 years scoring 7 tries.

Leeds Rhinos
In November 2013, Aiton signed a three-year contract with the Leeds Rhinos starting in 2014.

He played in the 2014 Challenge Cup Final victory over the Castleford Tigers at Wembley Stadium, Leeds' first in over a decade.

He missed part of the 2014 season due to medication he was taking that prevented him from playing. Aiton was injured towards the end of the 2015 season and missed out on winning the Treble with Leeds. He left making 47 appearances scoring 3 times.

Catalans Dragons
On 5 August 2015, Aiton decided not to sign a new deal with the Leeds Rhinos, instead moving on to play for France's biggest rugby league franchise the Catalans Dragons. Aiton said “I will always be honoured to have played for Leeds Rhinos but the opportunity to move to France from next season and be part of the Dragons was something that excited me at this stage in my career." He signed a three-year deal with the Dragons beginning in the 2016 season.

Representative career
In 2004, Aiton was selected to play for Papua New Guinea against Australia in a non-Test match.

In 2007, Aiton played 3 matches for PNG during their end of season tour of Europe.

Aiton was named in the Papua New Guinea squad for the 2008 Rugby League World Cup.

He captained Papua New Guinea in the 2010 Four Nations tournament.

He again played for Papua New Guinea in the 2013 Rugby League World Cup and 2017 Rugby League World Cup.

Coaching career
In 2021, Aiton was appointed assistant coach of the Papua New Guinea Hunters in the Queensland Cup.

References

External links
Catalans Dragons profile
(archived by web.archive.org) Cronulla Sharks profile
Paul Aiton at ''NRL.com
SL profile
2017 RLWC profile

1985 births
Living people
Catalans Dragons players
Cronulla-Sutherland Sharks players
Expatriate rugby league players in England
Leeds Rhinos players
Papua New Guinea national rugby league team captains
Papua New Guinea national rugby league team players
Papua New Guinean emigrants to Australia
Papua New Guinean expatriate rugby league players
Papua New Guinean expatriate sportspeople in England
Papua New Guinean people of Australian descent
Papua New Guinean rugby league players
Penrith Panthers players
People from the Western Highlands Province
Rugby league hookers
Rugby league locks
Wakefield Trinity players
Windsor Wolves players